= D. Huw Owen =

D. Huw Owen is a Welsh academic who is the former keeper of pictures and maps at the National Library of Wales and an historian of Wales.

== Selected publications ==
- The Chapels of Wales
- Hanes Cymoedd y Gwendraeth a Llanelli/History of the Gwendraeth Valleys and Llanelli
- Capeli Cymru
- Settlement and Society in Wales. 1989.
- Cyflwyniad i Adran Darluniau a Mapiau: Guide to the Department of Pictures and Maps
